60S ribosomal protein L39 is a protein that in humans is encoded by the RPL39 gene.

Ribosomes, the organelles that catalyze protein synthesis, consist of a small 40S subunit and a large 60S subunit. Together these subunits are composed of 4 RNA species and approximately 80 structurally distinct proteins. This gene encodes a ribosomal protein that is a component of the 60S subunit. The protein belongs to the S39E family of ribosomal proteins. It is located in the cytoplasm. In rat, the protein is the smallest, and one of the most basic, proteins of the ribosome. This gene is co-transcribed with the U69 small nucleolar RNA gene, which is located in its second intron. As is typical for genes encoding ribosomal proteins, there are multiple processed pseudogenes of this gene dispersed through the genome.

References

Further reading

Ribosomal proteins